Kędzierzyn-Koźle  is a city in southern Poland, the administrative center of Kędzierzyn-Koźle County. With 58,899 inhabitants as of 2021, it is the second most-populous city in the Opole Voivodeship.

Geography and economy
Kędzierzyn-Koźle is located in the historic Silesia (Upper Silesia) region at the confluence of the Oder River and its Kłodnica tributary. Situated on the lower reaches of the Gliwice Canal, it is a place of a major river port, has rail connections with all major cities of Poland and serves western outskirts of the Upper Silesian Metropolitan Union. The town is a major location of chemical industry, the site of several factories and a power plant at Blachownia Śląska. Zakłady Azotowe Kędzierzyn, a subsidiary of Grupa Azoty located in Kędzierzyn, is one of the largest chemical plants in Poland.

In 1975, the historic core Koźle on the left bank of the Oder was merged with the municipalities of Kędzierzyn, Sławięcice, and Kłodnica on the right shore, which had developed to suburbs since the 19th century industrialisation, to form present-day Kędzierzyn-Koźle.

History

Koźle

A border fortress held by a minor member of the Polish Piast dynasty was first mentioned in 1104, when it was besieged by the Přemyslid prince Svatopluk of Olomouc. The Koźle castellany was part of the Polish Duchy of Silesia since 1138, from 1172/73 of the Upper Silesian Duchy of Racibórz under the rule of the Silesian Piasts. In 1281, it was inherited by Duke Casimir of Bytom, who also called himself Duke of Koźle. Casimir soon turned to the neighbouring Kingdom of Bohemia; in 1289, he paid homage to King Wenceslaus II and received his duchy as a Bohemian fief. In 1293, he vested Koźle with town privileges, had walls erected. After Casimir was succeeded by his son Władysław in 1312, Koźle remained the capital of an autonomous duchy, ruled by the Bytom branch of the Silesian Piasts until the death of Duke Bolesław in 1355. King Charles IV adjudicated the reverted Bohemian fief to the Piast duke Konrad I of Oleśnica (Oels), whereafter the town remained a possession of the Oleśnica line until it became extinct in 1492.

Again purchased by the Opole duke Jan II the Good in 1509, the Koźle estates were ultimately incorporated into the Lands of the Bohemian Crown upon his death in 1532. Within the Habsburg monarchy, it was temporarily pawned to the Hohenzollern Margraves of Brandenburg-Ansbach. The fortress was besieged several times during the Thirty Years' War and occupied by Danish troops under the command of Duke John Ernest I of Saxe-Weimar in 1627, before they were defeated by Imperial forces under Albrecht von Wallenstein. Again conquered by a Swedish contingent led by Lennart Torstensson in 1642, the town remained almost completely devastated. In 1645, it returned to Polish rule under the House of Vasa.

Occupied by the troops of King Frederick the Great in the First Silesian War, Koźle as Cosel with the bulk of Silesia became a Prussian possession by the 1742 Treaty of Breslau. The king ordered the extension of the fortifications, nevertheless the town was occupied by Habsburg Pandurs during the Second Silesian War in 1744 and had to be reconquered by the Prussian Army two years later; the shelling again caused heavy losses and damages. The rebuilt fortress held against Austrian sieges during the Seven Years' War, even General Ernst Gideon von Laudon in 1760 had to raise his siege. In 1807 the Prussian garrison withstood another besiegement by the allied Napoleonic and Bavarian forces under General Bernhard Erasmus von Deroy until a peace was made by the Treaty of Tilsit. In 1815, Cosel was incorporated into the Prussian Province of Silesia, from 1871 part of the German Empire. In the 18th century, Cosel belonged to the tax inspection region of Neustadt. The development of the town was promoted by the construction of the Kłodnica Canal from the Oder port to Gliwice from 1806 until 1907.

After World War I and the Upper Silesia plebiscite of March 1921, the Polish insurgents temporarily captured the part of the town east of the Oder during the Third Silesian Uprising, however, the town remained part of Germany in the interbellum. Local Polish activists were intensively persecuted by the Germans since 1937.

During World War II, the Germans operated three forced labour subcamps (E2, E153, E155) of the Stalag VIII-B/344 prisoner-of-war camp in the town. In the course of the Vistula–Oder Offensive, the Soviet Red Army from 21 January 1945 attacked the Koźle bridgehead. Within the bulk of Silesia, it was transferred to Poland under the re-drawing of borders after World War II.

Kędzierzyn and other districts

Kędzierzyn was founded as a village in the 13th century, and Sławięcice was first mentioned in 13th-century documents, when both settlements were part of fragmented Piast-ruled Poland. Sławięcice even obtained town rights before 1260, but lost them in 1260, as Duke Władysław Opolski transferred them to nearby Ujazd.

During the Third Silesian Uprising, after a bloody battle, Polish insurgents captured Kędzierzyn in May 1921. In June 1921, the Germans attacked the Polish insurgents, and recaptured the settlement. The Germans then massacred captured Polish prisoners of war in nearby Lichynia.

During World War II, the Germans operated multiple forced labour camps in the area. In Kędzierzyn there was a forced labour "education" camp, and three subcamps (BAB 20/E794, BAB 40/E794, E711A) of the Stalag VIII-B/344 prisoner-of-war camp. In the present-day district of Blachownia Śląska there was a forced labour subcamp of the prison in Strzelce Opolskie, and four subcamps (BAB 21/E793, BAB 48/E793, E3, E714) of the Stalag VIII-B/344 camp. In the present-day district of Kłodnica, there was the E800 subcamp of the Stalag VIII-B/344 camp. In Sławięcice there was another forced labour "education" camp, two subcamps (E6, E207) of the Stalag VIII-B/344 camp, and a subcamp of the Auschwitz concentration camp which operated from April 1, 1944, to January 26, 1945. In Sławięcice, there was also a crematorium for the victims of the camps, which is now a memorial. Allied prisoners of war of various nationalities, Jews, and Polish children were among the victims of the forced labour camps. In the final stages of the war, in 1945, a German-conducted death march of thousands of prisoners of several subcamps of the Auschwitz concentration camp passed through Blachownia and Koźle towards the Gross-Rosen concentration camp.

Following Nazi Germany's defeat in the war, the region was transferred from Germany to Poland as stipulated by the Potsdam Agreement. In the years immediately following World War II, the ethnic German population was expelled, also in accordance with the Potsdam Agreement. The remaining Polish population was joined by Poles displaced from the eastern territories of Poland annexed by the Soviet Union.

In 1954, Blachownia and Lenartowice merged to form the Blachownia Śląska district in Sławięcice.

In 1999, the branch line connecting the city with Strzelce Opolskie closed as part of Polskie Koleje Państwowe cost-cutting.

Sławięcice
Sławięcice was once home to the now lost Sławięcice Palace (Schloss Slawentzitz), which was the main seat of the princes of Hohenlohe-Öhringen, a branch of the House of Hohenlohe. The palace was destroyed in the aftermath of the Second World War.

Sports
The town is home to ZAKSA Kędzierzyn-Koźle, one of the most successful Polish volleyball clubs, the nine–time Polish Champion, nine–time Polish Cup winner, and two–time winner of CEV Champions League (2021, 2022).

Notable people
Bernhard von Hülsen (1865–1950), German general
Gustav Giemsa (1867–1948), German chemist and bacteriologist
Tomasz Kamusella (born 1967), Polish scholar
Ewa Komander, Polish professional triathlete
Kamil Semeniuk (born 1996), Polish volleyball player
Rafał Wojaczek (1945–1971), Polish poet

Twin towns – sister cities

Kędzierzyn-Koźle is twinned with:

 Jonava, Lithuania
 Kalush, Ukraine
 Öhringen, Germany
 Pisz, Poland
 Přerov, Czech Republic
 Racibórz, Poland

References

External links
 Jewish Community in Kędzierzyn-Koźle on Virtual Shtetl

 
Cities and towns in Opole Voivodeship
Kedzierzyn Kozle

Holocaust locations in Poland